Frances Hellman is a physicist who was dean of the division of mathematical and physical sciences at the University of California, Berkeley from 2015 until 2021. Her primary academic focus has been the study of the thermodynamic properties of novel solid materials, especially thin film semiconducting, superconducting, and magnetic materials. She has served as chair of the physics department and holds a dual appointment in the materials science and engineering department.

Early life and education
Hellman was raised in New York City, where she attended the Brearley School. She graduated summa cum laude and Phi Beta Kappa with high honors in physics from Dartmouth College in 1978. Hellman obtained her Ph.D. in applied physics at Stanford University in 1985.

Career
After receiving her Ph.D., Hellman then served as a postdoctoral fellow at Bell Laboratories from 1985-1987 focusing on thin film magnetism.  She moved to San Diego, CA to become an assistant professor of physics at the University of California, San Diego 1987, where she worked until 2004. She received tenure in 1994 and became a full professor in 2000.  Hellman is a fellow of the American Physical Society (APS) and received their Joseph F. Keithley Award For Advances in Measurement Science in 2006.

Hellman joined Berkeley's Physics Department in January 2005. She served as Chair of the Department from 2007 to 2013. In 2019, she was elected to be the 2020 Vice President of the American Physical Society and in 2022 became the President of APS.

Personal

Hellman is the daughter of Chris and Warren Hellman of San Francisco. The Hellman family is involved philanthropically with a variety of causes, including the University of California.
Frances Hellman married Robert Dynes, former UC President, in May 1998 and they divorced in 2006.  In 2006 she met Warren Breslau.  In 2009 they married.

References

External links
Frances Hellman at University of California, Berkeley

Living people
American people of German-Jewish descent
21st-century American physicists
Year of birth missing (living people)
Stanford University alumni
University of California, San Diego faculty
University of California, Berkeley College of Letters and Science faculty
Dartmouth College alumni
Chapin School (Manhattan) alumni
Scientists from New York (state)
Hellman family
Fellows of the American Physical Society